The 2022 CAFA Women's Championship was the second edition of the CAFA Women's Championship, the quadrennial international women's football championship organised by the CAFA for the women's national teams of Central Asia. The tournament was hosted by Tajikistan.

All but Afghanistan entered the tournament as the team's participation was impossible under the Taliban rule. with Turkmenistan making its debut in the tournament.

Uzbekistan were the defending champions, having won their first title in 2018. They managed to retain the title undefeated. Hosts Tajikistan finished last losing three games and drawing one against the debutant Turkmenistan who finished fourth with one point apart from their Tajik counterpart.

Participating nations
A total of 5 CAFA nations entered the main tournament (including Turkmenistan which entered for the first time at senior women's level).

Did not enter

Venues
On 3 July 2022, Republic Central Stadium was confirmed as the sole venue of the tournament.

Officials
CAFA selected these match officials to officiate the tournament.

Referees

  Mahsa Ghorbani
  Malika Kadyrova
  Nodira Mirzoeva
  Resul Mammedov
  Anna Sidorova

Assistant Referees

  Ensieh Khabaz
  Ramina Tsoi
  Dilshoda Rahmonova
  Akmurad Kurbanov
  Kristina Sereda

Squads 

Each national team had to submit a squad of 23 players.

Main tournament 
The official match schedule was confirmed by the CAFA on 3 July 2022.

Tiebreakers
Ranking in each group shall be determined as follows:
 Greater number of points obtained in all the group matches;
 Goal difference in all the group matches;
 Greater number of goals scored in all the group matches;
 Greater disciplinary points.
If two or more teams are equal on the basis on the above four criteria, the place shall be determined as follows:
 Result of the direct match between the teams concerned;
 Penalty shoot-out if only the teams are tied, and they met in the last round of the group;
 Drawing lots by the Organising Committee.

All times listed are Tajikistan Time (UTC+05:00)

Tournament table

Goalscorers

Discipline 
In the final tournament, a player was suspended for the subsequent match in the competition for either getting red card or accumulating two yellow cards in two different matches.

Awards
The following awards were given at the conclusion of the tournament:

Most Valuable Player
The Most Valuable Player of the Tournament award was given to Nilufar Kudratova.
  Nilufar Kudratova

Top Scorer
The top scorer award was given to the top scorer in the tournament. Nilufar Kudratova won the award with seven goals scored in the tournament.
  Nilufar Kudratova

Fairplay Award
The Fairplay Award was given to the Iran women's national football team.

Special Award
the Special Award was given to the Turkmenistan women's national football team after they finished fourth overall.

See also
 2022 AFC Women's Asian Cup
 2022 AFF Women's Championship
 2022 EAFF E-1 Football Championship (women)
 2022 SAFF Women's Championship
 2022 WAFF Women's Championship

References

Sport in Dushanbe
CAFA Women's Championship
CAFA Women's Championship
CAFA Women's Championship
International association football competitions hosted by Tajikistan
CAFA Women's Championship